Tami Hert is an American R&B singer, who was signed to Epic Records in the 1990s. Her debut single "If You Were Mine" was released in 1998, and charted on the US Billboard R&B chart. 

She also appeared on Soul Train.

References

Living people
Year of birth missing (living people)
Place of birth missing (living people)
American contemporary R&B singers